The following is a list of psychology and self-help podcasts that focus on popular psychology, meditation, and mindfulness.

List

See also 

 Self-help
 Meditation

References 

Psychology
Popular psychology works